Margaret Rose Mountford (née Swale, born 24 November 1951) is a Northern Irish lawyer, businesswoman and television personality best known for her role in The Apprentice.

Biography
Mountford is originally from Holywood in County Down, Northern Ireland. She was educated at the voluntary grammar school, Strathearn School, in Belfast, then at Girton College, Cambridge.

Mountford spent a number of years as a lawyer with Herbert Smith, before taking on roles as non-executive director at Amstrad and Georgica. She chairs the board of governors of St Marylebone, an inner-London Church of England Comprehensive School.

After Mountford retired in 1999 she completed a degree in Ancient World Studies at University College London and then a MA in Classics. In April 2012, Mountford completed her PhD in Papyrology at University College, London, with her thesis entitled Documentary papyri from Roman And Byzantine Oxyrhynchus.

Mountford also chairs the Bright Ideas Trust which was set up by the first Apprentice winner Tim Campbell, and helps young people start their own businesses.

Television
From 2005 to 2009, Mountford was one of Alan Sugar's advisers, alongside Nick Hewer, in the UK version of The Apprentice television show, a role with which she achieved increasing public popularity.  Mountford also took part on the panel in The Apprentice - You're Fired on 27 May 2009 for the first time, during which she hinted that Lorraine would not make the final.

In June 2009, Mountford announced she was leaving the show at the end of Series 5 in order to concentrate on her PhD and was replaced for Series 6 by businesswoman Karren Brady.

She appeared in  an episode of the 2010 series, where she helped Alan Sugar narrow down the candidates to a final two. Mountford returned for the Apprentice Finals in 2011, 2012 and 2013 in a similar role.

In March 2012 and January 2013, Mountford appeared on  Channel 4's Countdown in Dictionary Corner, presented by her fellow Apprentice adviser Nick Hewer. In March 2013, Mountford presented a one-off BBC documentary programme Pompeii: The Mystery of the People Frozen in Time.

In July 2013, Mountford co-presented a two-part BBC One documentary with Hewer entitled We All Pay Your Benefits, filmed in Ipswich, the show investigated the benefit culture.

In October 2013, she presented a BBC Two Northern Ireland documentary called Groundbreakers: Ulster's Forgotten Radical, which highlighted the forgotten women's rights campaigner from the 19th century, Isabella Tod.

On 15 and 16 July 2014, Mountford co-presented a BBC One documentary with Hewer entitled Nick and Margaret: Too many Immigrants? which researched the impact of and attitudes towards immigrants in the UK and London.

Between 24 and 28 November 2014, Mountford presented a BBC One programme entitled Don't Mess with Me which displayed the challenges that the public and Councils in the UK face against littering, as well as convincing the public to pick up their rubbish and take a stand to the problem. The programme considered scientific research into the problem as well as preventative action.

In December 2015 Mountford appeared, alongside Nick Hewer, in BBC's Celebrity Antiques Road Trip.

In May 2019 she presented a programme on the Classical poet Sappho on BBC Four titled "Sappho: Love & Life on Lesbos with Margaret Mountford".

Classicist
Mountford is currently on the Steering Committee for the Society for the Promotion of Hellenic Studies and is the Chair of the Egypt Exploration Society.

In January 2019 Mountford gave a lecture at Haileybury titled "Papyrology – From Rubbish Bins to Riches", and in June 2019 she gave a lecture hosted by the British School at Athens and the Egypt Exploration Society titled "Papyrology: is anything new under the sun?".

Publications
2012. Documentary papyri from Roman And Byzantine Oxyrhynchus (PhD Thesis). University College London
2012. "A day at the races in Byzantine Oxyrhynchus", Egyptian Archaeology 41: 5–7.

References 

The Apprentice (British TV series)
Alumni of Girton College, Cambridge
Alumni of University College London
Living people
British businesspeople
British solicitors
1951 births
People from Holywood, County Down
British television personalities
Protestants from Northern Ireland
People educated at Strathearn School
British women lawyers
Women classical scholars
Papyrologists